Charles Ray Knight (born December 28, 1952) is an American former Major League Baseball infielder best remembered for his time with the Cincinnati Reds and New York Mets. Originally drafted by the Reds in the tenth round of the 1970 Major League Baseball Draft, he is best remembered to Reds fans as the man who replaced Pete Rose at third base, whereas Mets fans remember Knight as the man who scored the winning run of game six of the 1986 World Series and as the MVP of that series. He was most recently a studio analyst and occasional game analyst for the Mid-Atlantic Sports Network's coverage of the Washington Nationals from 2007 to 2018.

Early life 
Knight grew up in Albany, Georgia, and attended Dougherty High School and Albany Junior College.

Career

Cincinnati Reds
In 1976, with only one home run coming into the final month of the season, Knight borrowed a bat from Reds star George Foster and hit nine in the remaining games of the year. He would later borrow Foster's bat again in the major leagues when Foster was injured. During those seasons, the Reds won two World Series titles.

Knight responded with a .318 Batting average, 10 home runs, 79 RBIs and 64 runs scored to finish fifth in National League Most Valuable Player balloting.

On May 13, Knight broke out of an 0-for-15 slump by homering twice in the fifth inning of a 15–4 win over the Mets. He was the first Red to hit two home runs in one inning.  Aaron Boone matched the feat on August 9, 2002. He made his first All-star appearance in 1980, hitting a single off Tommy John in his first at-bat.

In , Knight batted .259 with six home runs and 34 RBIs. On December 18, 1981, he was traded to the Houston Astros for César Cedeño, to accommodate Johnny Bench's move from behind the plate to third base.

Houston Astros
Knight split his time between third and first base with the Astros. However, he made more appearances at first than he did at third during the regular season.

New York Mets
Knight platooned third base with the newly acquired Howard Johnson for the 1985 and 1986 seasons. In his first full season with the Mets, Knight batted only .218 with six home runs and 36 RBIs. During the off-season, the Mets attempted to trade Knight to the Pittsburgh Pirates for Lee Mazzilli, but were denied.

Knight adopted a new batting stance in 1986 and saw immediate results, crushing six home runs and batting .306 with twelve RBIs in the month of April. Teammate Ron Darling spoke highly of Knight's contributions in a midseason interview: "Besides our pitching, it has been Ray Knight's emergence that has been the difference. He carried us for a long time." On July 22, Knight incited a bench clearing brawl at Riverfront Stadium against his former teammates. Eric Davis pinch-running for Reds player/manager Pete Rose in the tenth inning stole second and third base. Knight took the throw from Mets catcher Gary Carter late, brought his glove to Davis' face and knocked his helmet off. A stare off ensued, followed by a right cross from Knight. The benches emptied and as a result of all the ejections from this fight (along with Darryl Strawberry who had previously been ejected for arguing balls and strikes), back-up catcher Ed Hearn was brought into the game, and Carter moved from behind the plate to third. The Mets won the game in fourteen innings.

The Mets won 108 games in 1986 and took the National League East convincingly by 21.5 games over the Phillies. For the season, Knight batted .298 with eleven home runs and 76 RBIs to earn NL Comeback Player of the Year honors. Knight batted only .167 in the 1986 National League Championship Series against his former teammates, the Houston Astros. In the World Series, however, Knight broke out with a .391 batting average and five RBIs.

The Mets won the 1986 World Series in seven games over the Boston Red Sox. Knight's single in the tenth inning of game six of the Series drove in Gary Carter for the first run of the inning, and also pushed Kevin Mitchell to third, allowing him to score on Bob Stanley's wild pitch. Knight then scored the winning run from second after Mookie Wilson's ground ball went through the legs of Bill Buckner, and Knight's celebration as he rounded third to score was one of the indelible images of the series.

He hit the tiebreaking home run in game seven, and was rewarded with the World Series MVP award and the Baseball Writers' Association of America's Babe Ruth Award for the best performance in the World Series.

Baltimore Orioles
The Orioles finished sixth in the American League East in 1987, narrowly avoiding one hundred losses (95). For his own part, Knight batted .256 with 65 RBIs and tied his career high with fourteen home runs. Following the season, he was traded to the Detroit Tigers for pitcher Mark Thurmond. Knight served primarily as the Tigers' first baseman or designated hitter, though he did see some playing time at third and in the outfield. Knight batted only .217 with three home runs, and retired at the end of the season.

Career stats

Post-playing career
Upon retiring from baseball, Knight became an ESPN broadcaster. Early in the  season, Reds owner Marge Schott announced that Knight would replace Davey Johnson as manager of the Reds in  regardless of how the Reds did. Schott and Johnson had never gotten along, and relations between the two had deteriorated to the point that she almost fired Johnson after the  season. However, the Reds were doing so well under Johnson (they led the National League Central at the time of the 1994 Major League Baseball strike and won the division in 1995) that she instead opted to name Knight as assistant manager, with the understanding that he would succeed Johnson in 1996.

In 1997, he forgot how many outs there had been in a half-inning in which the Reds were at bat and called for a bunt at an inopportune time. He later fined himself $250 for the incident. The team's lack of success would lead to his firing midway through the 1997 season in favor of Jack McKeon.

From 2007 to 2018, Knight was a broadcaster with the Mid-Atlantic Sports Network (MASN) and co-hosted Nats Xtra, MASN's pregame and postgame show for its Washington Nationals broadcasts. Johnny Holliday, Knight's fellow MASN broadcaster and Nats Xtra co-host, playfully referred to him as the "Silver Fox."

Managerial record

1986 Mets reunion
Knight was one of several members of the 1986 championship team not to attend the 20th anniversary celebration at Shea Stadium on August 19, 2006; the others included manager Davey Johnson, (who was managing Team USA in Cuba), Dwight Gooden (who was serving a jail sentence), Roger McDowell (who was the Atlanta Braves pitching coach at the time), Lee Mazzilli (who was the New York Yankees bench coach at the time), and pitching coach Mel Stottlemyre. Knight's absence was due to a previous commitment.

Personal life
Knight married LPGA golfer Nancy Lopez on October 25, 1982, in Pelham, Georgia. The wedding, the second for both, was at the home of his partner in a Pelham sporting goods store. Knight and Lopez met by chance in Korakuen Stadium in Tokyo in 1978. He and Lopez had three daughters together, Ashley Marie (1983), Erinn Shea (1986) and Torri Heather Knight (1991). They lived in Albany, Georgia, and also had a home in The Villages, Florida. Lopez designed her first golf course for The Villages and the three nines of the 27-hole Lopez Legacy course are named for the daughters: Ashley Meadows, Torri Pines, and Erinn Glenn. In 1985, he had a 7 handicap in golf and sometimes caddied for her, but not in big tournaments. Knight and Lopez divorced in 2009. He also has a son, Brooks Knight, from his first marriage.

In 2013, Phoebe Putney Hospital in Albany, Georgia, unveiled a street on the property named Ray Knight Way.

Knight is good friends with former Reds' teammate Harry Spilman, who grew up twenty minutes away from Knight in Georgia. While they were both in the Reds' system, the two spent $700 on a pitching machine to work on their hitting.

Knight is a member of the Golden Gloves boxing association.

On October 23, 2017, Knight was arrested after an altercation at his condo in the Alexandria, Virginia, area with an unidentified 33-year-old man. Both were taken to the hospital and Knight was charged with assault and battery. The charges were subsequently dropped.

Knight participated in the 2021 ESPN 30 for 30 documentary series about the 1986 New York Mets season, Once Upon a Time in Queens.

See also
 Houston Astros award winners and league leaders

References

External links

1952 births
Living people
Baseball players from Georgia (U.S. state)
National League All-Stars
Cincinnati Reds players
Houston Astros players
New York Mets players
Baltimore Orioles players
Detroit Tigers players
Indianapolis Indians players
Major League Baseball third basemen
Major League Baseball first basemen
Cincinnati Reds managers
Cincinnati Reds coaches
Sportspeople from Albany, Georgia
Major League Baseball broadcasters
Washington Nationals announcers
Mid-Atlantic Sports Network
World Series Most Valuable Player Award winners
Sioux Falls Packers players
Trois-Rivières Aigles players